Alessio Scarchilli (born September 10, 1972) is a retired Italian professional football player. He played for 6 seasons (93 games, 10 goals) in the Serie A for A.S. Roma, U.C. Sampdoria and most notably for Torino F.C. He played in the UEFA Cup for Roma and Sampdoria.

He represented Italy in the 1994 UEFA European Under-21 Football Championship.

Currently, he works as a TV commentator on a channel dedicated to A.S. Roma.

1972 births
Living people
Italian footballers
Italy under-21 international footballers
Serie A players
Serie B players
A.S. Roma players
U.S. Lecce players
Udinese Calcio players
Torino F.C. players
U.C. Sampdoria players
Italian expatriate footballers
Expatriate footballers in Belgium
Italian expatriate sportspeople in Belgium
Belgian Pro League players
R.A.E.C. Mons players
Association football midfielders